The 2002 season was the Houston Texans' debut season in the National Football League and the first NFL season for the city of Houston since the Oilers moved to Tennessee to become the Titans in 1997. Their coaching staff was headed by Dom Capers, who previously coached the expansion Carolina Panthers when they debuted in 1995. The divisional realignment also placed the Texans and Titans in the same division.

The Texans won their inaugural regular season game against the Dallas Cowboys 19–10 on Sunday Night Football. They were the first to do this since the 1961 Minnesota Vikings won their inaugural game. The Texans finished their debut season with a 4–12 record.

Due to being an expansion franchise, the Texans were given the first overall pick in the 2002 NFL Draft. Houston used the selection on Fresno State quarterback David Carr. Carr finished the season with 2,592 passing yards, setting the franchise record for most passing yards by a rookie in a single season. Carr's record would not be broken until 2021, when Davis Mills finished that season with 2,664 passing yards.

Football returns to Houston

In June 1997, Bob McNair and Chuck Watson's plans for a National Hockey League expansion team fell apart due to the lack of an arena in the Houston area. Afterward, the Houston Oilers moved to Nashville to become the Tennessee Titans. The discussion eventually began to create a new NFL expansion team, with the 31st being awarded to the reformed Cleveland Browns. Houston and Los Angeles were the two finalists, and on October 6, 1999, the league's owners voted unanimously to award Houston the 32nd franchise. In 2000, the new team, tentatively known as "Houston NFL 2002", decided on five potential team names: Apollos, Bobcats, Stallions, Texans and Wildcatters. This shortlist was eventually reduced to Apollos, Stallions and Texans. On September 6, the team name was officially revealed as the Houston Texans.

On January 19, 2000, the team hired former Washington Redskins general manager Charley Casserly to serve in the same position. In the search for a head coach, Miami coach Butch Davis was involved in discussions with McNair, but elected to stay with the university. In January 2001, the Texans hired Jacksonville Jaguars defensive coordinator Dom Capers as head coach; Capers had previously worked with the expansion Carolina Panthers as their HC. On January 20, Indianapolis Colts defensive coordinator Vic Fangio joined the staff in the same role, followed by former Cleveland Browns head coach Chris Palmer as offensive coordinator on February 3.

Offseason

Free agency
On November 5, 2001, the Texans held workouts for defensive backs at the Reliant Astrodome. On December 29, the team signed ten players: running back Michael Basnight, safety Leomont Evans, tackles Robert Hicks and Jerry Wisne, defensive tackle Jason Nikolao, quarterback Mike Quinn, fullback Matt Snider, cornerback Jason Suttle, linebacker Casey Tisdale and safety Kevin Williams. On March 6, 2002, Colts offensive lineman Steve McKinney became the first unrestricted free agent to be signed by the Texans.

Expansion draft

To fill the Texans roster, the NFL held an expansion draft on February 18. The team was permitted to select 42 players from the other 31 teams, each of which allowed five players to be drafted. Houston were required to select 30 players or spend 38 percent ($27.24 million) of the $71.7 million salary cap.

The first player that the Texans selected was Jacksonville Jaguars offensive tackle Tony Boselli; however, the five-time Pro Bowler had been suffering from shoulder injuries during the 2001 season and never played a snap for the Texans. Houston also selected 18 more players.

On February 26, quarterback Danny Wuerffel was traded to the Washington Redskins for defensive tackle Jerry DeLoach. The Texans had intended to draft DeLoach, but the Redskins replaced him with Matt Campbell.

^ Made roster.

NFL draft

Undrafted free agents

Staff

Roster

Preseason

Regular season

Schedule

Note: Intra-division opponents are in bold text.

Game summaries

Week 1: vs. Dallas Cowboys

Week 2: at San Diego Chargers

Week 3: vs. Indianapolis Colts

Week 4: at Philadelphia Eagles

Week 6: vs. Buffalo Bills

Week 7: at Cleveland Browns

Week 8: at Jacksonville Jaguars
{{Americanfootballbox
 |titlestyle=;text-align:center;
 |state=autocollapse
 |title=Week 8: Houston Texans at Jacksonville Jaguars – Game summary
 |date=October 27, 2002
 |time=3:15 p.m. CST
 |road=Texans
 |R1=0|R2=7|R3=3|R4=11
 |home=Jaguars
 |H1=0|H2=9|H3=3|H4=7
 |stadium=Alltel Stadium, Jacksonville, Florida
 |attendance=53,721
 |weather=
 |referee=Ron Blum
 |TV=CBS
 |TVAnnouncers=Ian Eagle and Solomon Wilcots
 |reference=Recap
 |scoring=
First quarter
No scoring plays
Second quarter
JAX – Jimmy Smith 25-yard pass from Mark Brunell (Tim Seder kick), 12:11. Jaguars 7–0. Drive: 7 plays, 74 yards, 2:39.
HOU – Jonathan Wells 3-yard run (Kris Brown kick), 8:31. Tied 7–7. Drive: 4 plays, 44 yards, 2:08.
JAX – Chad Stanley tackled in end zone, 5:15. Jaguars 9–7.
Third quarter
HOU – Kris Brown 43-yard field goal, 11:55. Texans 10–9. Drive: 6 plays, 46 yards, 3:39.
JAX – Tim Seder 34-yard field goal, 6:31. Jaguars 12–10. Drive: 4 plays, 7 yards, 0:43.
Fourth quarter
HOU – Billy Miller 1-yard pass from David Carr (Carr pass to Gaffney), 18–12. Drive: 10 plays, 80 yards, 4:12.JAX – Stacey Mack 2-yard run (Tim Seder kick), 7:58. Jaguars 19–18. Drive: 7 plays, 70 yards, 3:22.HOU – Kris Brown 45-yard field goal, 2:24. Texans 21–19. Drive: 4 plays, 50 yards, 0:28. |stats=
Top passers
HOU – David Carr – 11/18, 184 yards, TD
JAX – Mark Brunell – 16/34, 202 yards, TD
Top rushers
HOU – James Allen – 10 rushes, 40 yards
JAX – Fred Taylor – 25 rushes, 85 yards
Top receivers
HOU – Billy Miller – 3 receptions, 78 yards, TD
JAX – Jimmy Smith – 4 receptions, 80 yards, TD
Texans win their first road game in franchise history.
}}

Week 9: vs. Cincinnati Bengals

Week 10: at Tennessee Titans

Week 11: vs. Jacksonville Jaguars

Week 12: vs. New York Giants

The Giants entered the game at 6–4 looking for an easy victory over the expansion Texans. The first quarter was scoreless with miscues from both teams. Houston received the opening kickoff, but went three-and-out, punting the ball to end the drive. On the second play of the following drive, New York running back Tiki Barber fumbled the ball at the Giants 27-yard line with the ball being recovered by Houston linebacker Jamie Sharper. On the next drive, Texans' running back James Allen fumbled the ball and it was recovered at the New York 30-yard line by linebacker Dhani Jones for the Giants. The two teams would trade punts with the first points being scored by Houston kicker Kris Brown on a 40-yard field goal in the second quarter. The Giants would respond a few drives later with Barber scoring on a 1-yard touchdown run. The game's next scoring play would come late in the second quarter. New York long snapper Bob Jones fumbled the snap with the ball being recovered by punter Matt Allen, who was tackled in his own end zone for a safety with the Texans trailing 5–7 at halftime.

Houston's first touchdown of the game came in the 3rd quarter, with a 1-yard run from Jonathan Wells. The Texans went for two, with Allen catching a pass from David Carr to put Houston up 13–7 with 6:57 left in the 3rd quarter. The Giants' following drive ended with Matt Bryant missing a 33-yard field goal. New York would score on its next possession with a 31-yard pass from Kerry Collins to receiver Amani Toomer to the Giants up 14–13 with 13:18 left in the game. Houston responded on the next drive with a 50-yard field goal to take a 16–14 lead with 6:57 left. The Giants had three drives to respond, but Collins was picked off twice on back-to-back possessions with the last play of the game being a failed Hail Mary to give the Texans a 16–14 upset victory.

Week 13: at Indianapolis Colts

Week 14: at Pittsburgh Steelers

The Texans had one of the worst offensive performances ever in an NFL game, only having 47 total yards of offense while the Steelers had 422 yards. The Texans' defense forced five turnovers and scored three touchdowns. Pittsburgh quarterback Tommy Maddox threw two interceptions, both of which were returned for touchdowns by Houston cornerback Aaron Glenn; Maddox also lost a fumble that was recovered by Texans cornerback Kenny Wright for a touchdown.

Week 15: vs. Baltimore Ravens

Week 16: at Washington Redskins

Week 17: vs. Tennessee Titans

This was the Titans' first game to be played in Houston since December 15, 1996 when the team was known as the Houston Oilers.

Standings

Statistics
Despite being in their first season, Football Outsiders calculated that the Texans were, play-for-play, the least successful team in the NFL in 2002. FO'' also stated that the 2002 Texans had the worst offense and third-worst run offense they have ever tracked.

Team

Individual

Source:

References

Houston Texans seasons
Houston